Yuri Alekseyevich Moiseyev (born 15 December 1960) is a Russian professional football coach and a former player.

Club career
He made his professional debut in the Soviet Second League in 1978 for FC Khimik Novomoskovsk.

External links
 

1960 births
People from Novomoskovsky District
Living people
Soviet footballers
Russian footballers
Association football forwards
FC Khimik-Arsenal players
FC Spartak Moscow players
FC Arsenal Tula players
FC Shinnik Yaroslavl players
FC Okean Nakhodka players
FC Lokomotiv Nizhny Novgorod players
Russian Premier League players
Russian football managers
FC Khimik-Arsenal managers
FC Spartak Kostroma players
Sportspeople from Tula Oblast